Charles Guézille (3 June 1899 – 20 June 1964) was a French long jumper. He competed at the 1920 Summer Olympics and finished 27th.

References

1899 births
1964 deaths
French male long jumpers
Athletes (track and field) at the 1920 Summer Olympics
Olympic athletes of France